De Koninck (The King in old Dutch spelling) is a surname. Notable people with the surname include:

Charles De Koninck (1906-1965), Belgian-Canadian Thomist philosopher and theologian
David de Koninck alternative spelling of David de Coninck (c.1644-1701), Flemish painter
Jean-Marie De Koninck (b. 1948), Quebec mathematician
Laurent-Guillaume de Koninck (1809-1887), Belgian palaeontologist and chemist
Lodewijk de Koninck (1838-1924), Flemish writer
Louis Herman De Koninck (1896-1984), Belgian architect and designer
Servaes de Koninck (c.1654-c.1701), Flemish composer active in Amsterdam

Koninck:
Jacob Koninck (I) (c.1615-c.1695), Dutch landscape painter (brother of Philips)
Jacob Koninck (II) (c.1647-c.1724), Dutch painter for the Danish court (son of Jacob I)
Philips (de) Koninck (1619-1688), Dutch landscape painter (brother of Jacob I)
Salomon Koninck, Dutch painter of genre scenes and portraits and engraver

See also
De Koninck Brewery, a Belgian brewery
De Coninck
De Koning
Konink

Dutch-language surnames